Iran competed in the 2021 Asian Youth Para Games which will be held in Manama, Bahrain from 2 to 6 December 2021. Iran contingent has 111 athletes who will compete in nine sports.

Competitors
The following is the list of number of competitors in the Games:

Medalists

See also
 Malaysia at the 2021 Asian Youth Para Games
 Thailand at the 2021 Asian Youth Para Games
 India at the 2021 Asian Youth Para Games

References

Iran 2021
Asian Youth Para Games, 2021
Nations at the 2021 Asian Youth Para Games